Pinopolis Dam is a dam in Berkeley County, South Carolina.

The earthen and concrete dam was completed in 1941 by Santee Cooper, the state-owned electric and water utility also known as South Carolina Public Service Authority.  The dam is 138 feet high and 11,500 feet long at its crest.

Broadly speaking, the dam impounds the Cooper River and creates Lake Moultrie.  Specifically Lake Moultrie is fed directly from Lake Marion by a diversion canal built concurrently with the dam.  This artificial rerouting of the Cooper River basin has effectively unified the Santee and Cooper River systems into a single hydrological drainage entity.

The overall New Deal-era Santee Cooper Power and Navigation Project improved navigation, provided hydroelectric power, and improved the general health, recreation, and economy of the area. The Pinopolis Dam included the hydroelectric station and navigation lock, the highest single-lift lock in the world. A  spillway was built to control floodwaters, with 62 gates allowing overflow of excess water. In completing the largest earth-moving project in the nation's history,  of earth were moved and 3.1 million cubic yards of concrete were poured.

The $48.2 million project (55 percent federal loan, 45 percent federal grant) first generated electricity on Feb. 17, 1942. As transmission lines were built, power flowed to customers in Berkeley, Georgetown and Horry counties, and ultimately to electric cooperatives serving customers in 46 counties.

The Pinopolis generating station was renamed Jefferies Hydroelectric Station in 1996 after Richard Manning Jefferies, former Governor of South Carolina and executive of Santee Cooper. It produced 243 MWh electricity in 2019.

The project also flooded the Santee Canal, the cemeteries and plantations of St John's Parish Berkeley, and other historic resources.

References

External links 

 online photographic scrapbook documenting the early construction of the Pinopolis and Santee dams and reservoirs from April to December 1939

Dams in South Carolina
United States state-owned dams
Buildings and structures in Berkeley County, South Carolina
Dams completed in 1942
Hydroelectric power plants in South Carolina
Santee River
1942 establishments in South Carolina